Purbach may refer to:

Purbach am Neusiedlersee — a town in Burgenland, Austria

Purbach (crater), a large lunar crater
Georg Purbach — an Austrian astronomer and mathematician